Adrian Cárdenas Rubio (born October 10, 1987) is a former American professional baseball second baseman.

Background
Cárdenas' father Juan first attempted to defect from Cuba in 1966 at age 17. He hid on a boat docked at Matanzas Bay, but was caught in Havana and sent to a labor camp in Turiguanó. There he began writing to a former teacher, Hedda Schmidt, who he had met at the University of Havana. Three years later, they married. Juan successfully escaped Cuba in 1970, from Mariel. Schmidt soon joined him in Miami. They moved to San Francisco, and later divorced. Adrian Cárdenas is the son of Juan and his second wife, Aida Rubio.

Career

Philadelphia Phillies
Cárdenas was selected by the Philadelphia Phillies in the first round of the 2006 Major League Baseball Draft out of Monsignor Pace High School, where he graduated in the top ten percent of his class. Cárdenas won the 2006 Baseball America High School Player of the Year Award. He was assigned to the GCL Phillies, where in 41 games, he hit .318 with 2 home runs (HRs), 21 runs batted in (RBIs) and 13 stolen bases (SBs).

Cárdenas spent 2007 with Single-A Lakewood, where in 127 games, he hit .295 with 9 HRs, 79 RBIs and 20 SBs. Cárdenas played in the 2007 All-Star Futures Game. Cárdenas began 2008 with A-Advanced Clearwater, where he played until he was traded.

Oakland Athletics
On July 17, 2008, the Phillies traded Cárdenas, Josh Outman and Matthew Spencer to the Oakland Athletics in exchange for Joe Blanton. He was assigned to A-Advanced Stockton, but was promoted to Double-A Midland in August. In 109 total games, he hit .296 with 5 HRs, 40 RBIs and 17 SBs.

Cárdenas was a non-roster invitee to the Oakland Athletics spring training camp in 2009. He split the season with Midland and Triple-A Sacramento. In 130 games total, he hit .299 with 4 HRs and 79 RBIs.

To start the 2010 season, Cárdenas was ranked ninth in Oakland's farm system according to Baseball America and again was at big-league camp as a non-roster invitee. He opened the year at Sacramento, but was demoted to Midland in June. He was promoted back to Sacramento in August. In 109 games total, .304 with 4 HRs and 53 RBIs. Cárdenas spent 2011 with Sacramento, where in 127 games, he hit .314 with 5 HRs, 51 RBIs and 13 SBs. After the season, Cárdenas was added to the 40-man roster.

On January 26, 2012, Cárdenas was designated for assignment by the Athletics to make room on the 40-man roster for new signee Jonny Gomes.

Chicago Cubs
On February 6, 2012, Cárdenas was claimed off waivers by the Chicago Cubs. On May 7, 2012, he was recalled from Triple-A Iowa, replacing Travis Wood. He made his Major League debut that day as a pinch-hitter, lining out. His first start came the next day, at second base. His first hit, a double off of José Veras of the Milwaukee Brewers, came in his fifth game. He spent most of July with Iowa, but was recalled on July 31. After being optioned to Iowa on August 21, he was recalled when the rosters expanded in September. He was used mostly off the bench, starting in only nine games. In 45 games with Chicago, he hit .183 with 2 RBIs. On October 25, Cárdenas was outrighted off the 40-man roster.

After baseball 
Cárdenas retired from baseball after the 2012 season because he no longer enjoyed the game. He returned to the creative writing and philosophy department at New York University, from which he had been taking part-time classes since 2010. He graduated in 2015, and returned to NYU to obtain a master of fine arts degree which he received in 2018. In 2019 he filmed a 12 minute short in Cuba which played at some film festivals.

References

External links

1987 births
Living people
Chicago Cubs players
Florida Complex League Phillies players
Lakewood BlueClaws players
Clearwater Threshers players
Stockton Ports players
Midland RockHounds players
Sacramento River Cats players
Iowa Cubs players
American sportspeople of Cuban descent
People from Miami Lakes, Florida
Monsignor Edward Pace High School alumni